The 2006 Asian Games featured 21 competition venues.

Venues

The Sports City

Others

References

 
2006
2006 Asian Games